PA Music Scene Magazine is a monthly online music magazine focusing on the local Pennsylvania music talent, music businesses and music venues. The magazine features articles targeting bands/musicians in the music scene, album and show reviews, festivals and fairs, radio stations, venues, music videos and recording studios.

History
PA Music Scene magazine made its debut online in July 2009. It was founded in Pottsville, PA by music enthusiast, Gina Tutko. She was inspired to create the publication from seeing her brother-law play with the band HotWingJones. The goal of the magazine is to support local musicians.

References

External links
 Official website

2009 establishments in Pennsylvania
Monthly magazines published in the United States
Online music magazines published in the United States
Magazines established in 2009
Magazines published in Pennsylvania